Ivan Jazbinšek (9 August 1914 – 28 June 1996) was a Croatian footballer of Slovenian origin who played as a defender.

Club career
Jazbinšek started his career with Zagreb sides, ŠK Meteor and ŠK Policijski. After a short stint at BSK Beograd, he moved to top club HŠK Građanski Zagreb in 1935. With Građanski he won the 1937 and 1940 Yugoslav First League season, the 1943 Croatian First League and the 1948 Yugoslav Federal League. He stayed with Građanski until its disbanding by the communist regime in 1945. He later played for Metalac Zagreb and Dinamo Zagreb.

International career
Jazbinšek played seven times for the Kingdom of Yugoslavia, making his debut for them in an April 1938 World Cup qualification match against Poland. After its demise, he played eighteen matches for the Independent State of Croatia, a World War II-era puppet state of Nazi Germany. He was also part of Yugoslavia's squad for the football tournament at the 1948 Summer Olympics, but he did not play in any matches.

His final international was an April 1944 friendly match against Slovakia.

Managerial career
After his playing career he became a manager at NK Zagreb. He then moved on to become Dinamo's coach and won the Yugoslav Federal League in 1954. In 1971, he was appointed the head coach of Toronto Croatia in the National Soccer League, where he led Toronto to a NSL Championship and a Canadian Open Cup.

References

External links
 

1914 births
1996 deaths
Footballers from Zagreb
People from the Kingdom of Croatia-Slavonia
Croatian people of Slovenian descent
Association football defenders
Yugoslav footballers
Yugoslavia international footballers
Olympic footballers of Yugoslavia
Olympic silver medalists for Yugoslavia
Footballers at the 1948 Summer Olympics
Olympic medalists in football
Medalists at the 1948 Summer Olympics
Croatian footballers
Croatia international footballers
Dual internationalists (football)
OFK Beograd players
HŠK Građanski Zagreb players
GNK Dinamo Zagreb players
Yugoslav First League players
Yugoslav football managers
NK Zagreb managers
GNK Dinamo Zagreb managers
Hapoel Tel Aviv F.C. managers
Toronto Croatia managers
Canadian National Soccer League coaches
Yugoslav expatriate football managers
Expatriate soccer managers in Canada
Yugoslav expatriate sportspeople in Canada
Expatriate football managers in Israel
Yugoslav expatriate sportspeople in Israel
Burials at Mirogoj Cemetery